A16 (provisional name) is an MTR station on the Tuen Ma line to be constructed elevated on the bank of Tuen Mun River at the current site of Tuen Mun Swimming Pool. The construction of the station is gazetted as part of the Tuen Mun South extension by the Hong Kong Government in January 2022. The station is expected to open for service in 2030.

Station layout 
The station will be built with three levels, with station entrances at grade, concourse one level above ground, and platforms above the concourse. The station will have an island platform, and two siding tracks on each side of the main tracks.

History 

Michael Tien, the then panel member of the Panel on Transport of LegCo and former chairman of the KCRC, said in May 2019 that the authorities also planned an additional station near Tuen Mun Swimming Pool, raising the costs of construction from 5.5 billion HKD (2013) to around 16 billion HKD. He also said that the line extension may be developed in the "Rail + Property" model, with MTRC paying for the construction of the line and the Hong Kong Government allocating land to MTRC for building housing estates to compensate for the costs. It is expected that 6 to 7 thousand private housing flats and 13,000 public housing flats to be constructed.

The construction of the station was gazetted as part of the Tuen Mun South extension by the Hong Kong Government in January 2022. The environmental impact assessment was approved in July 2022.

References 

Tuen Mun
Proposed railway stations in Hong Kong
MTR stations in the New Territories